First-seeded Simonne Mathieu defeated Jadwiga Jędrzejowska 6–3, 8–6 in the final to win the women's singles tennis title at the 1939 French Championships.

Seeds
The seeded players are listed below. Simonne Mathieu is the champion; others show the round in which they were eliminated.

 Simonne Mathieu (champion)
 Sarah Fabyan (quarterfinals)
 Jadwiga Jędrzejowska (finalist)
 Mary Hardwick (quarterfinals)
 Madzy Rollin Couquerque (first round)
 Arlette Halff (quarterfinals)

Draw

Key
 Q = Qualifier
 WC = Wild card
 LL = Lucky loser
 r = Retired

Finals

Earlier rounds

Section 1

Section 2

References

External links

1939 in women's tennis
1939
1939 in French women's sport
1939 in French tennis